Seikkyi Kanaungto Township is located on the southwestern bank of Yangon river across from downtown Yangon, Myanmar. The township comprises eight wards, and is bounded by the Yangon river in the north, the Twante Canal in the east, and Twante Township in the south and west. The township is still largely rural and undeveloped mainly because it still lacks a bridge across the Yangon river to downtown.

Seikkyi Kanaungto has 16 primary schools, and one high school.

References

Townships of Yangon